William of Pontoise was a Benedictine hermit. He lived at Pontoise, France.

References

French Roman Catholic saints
12th-century Christian saints
1192 deaths
French Benedictines
Year of birth unknown